Věžná is a municipality and village in Žďár nad Sázavou District in the Vysočina Region of the Czech Republic. It has about 200 inhabitants.

Administrative parts
Villages of Jabloňov and Pernštejnské Janovice are administrative parts of Věžná.

References

Villages in Žďár nad Sázavou District